Leonard Beeghley (born December 14, 1946) is Professor Emeritus of sociology at the University of Florida since 1975. He received his Ph.D. from the University of California at Riverside in 1975 and has since published seven books over the course of his career. Two of these seven books, The Emergence of Sociological Theory and The Structure of Social Stratification in the United States "become standard references in the field." His interests include the relationships between social stratification, public policy and societal problems. He has been covering the socio-economic class structure of the United States in five volumes since 1978.

List of publications
Since 1978, Leonard Beegley has published the following books according to Amazon.com:
Structure of Social Stratification in the United States (5th Edition), 2007
The Emergence of Sociological Theory, 2006
Structure of Social Stratification in the United States (4th Edition), 2004
Homicide: A Sociological Explanation, 2003
Angles of Vision: How to Understand Social Problems, 1998
What Does Your Wife Do?: Gender and the Transformation of Family Life, 1996
Structure of Social Stratification in the United States (3rd Edition), 1995
Structure of Social Stratification in the United States (2nd Edition), 1989
Living Poorly in America, 1983
Social Stratification in America, 1978

See also
Sociology
Social class in the United States

References

1946 births
Living people
American social sciences writers
American sociologists
University of California, Riverside alumni
University of Florida faculty